Aimar is a masculine given name of Germanic origin, common in mainly the Basque Country and Estonia (with 5,500 resp. 600 name bearers) The name Aimar is also used as a surname, probably as a result of the name having been used as a patronymic.

Etymology
The name Aimar is an Frankish form of the German name Agimar, composed by agi- (either from age 'reverence, discipline' or egg 'edge') and -mar ('famous'). An alternative interpretation is that the namne is composed by the words haim ('home') and hard ('hard').

In Estonia, onomasticians have suggested that the name could be one of many versions of the popular name Aivar (in turn loaned from Latvian Aivars, a version of Scandinavian Ivar)

History
There are references to the name in medieval texts from the 13th to 14th centuries in the Kingdom of Navarre. In later years it has been assimilated as a Basque name, and it has become a popular name for boys in Basque Country and Navarre.

People with Aimar as first name
Hans Aimar Mow Grønvold (1846-1926), Norwegian civil servant
Aimar-Charles-Marie de Nicolaï (1747–1794), French writer
Aimar Moratalla (born 1987), Spanish football player
Aimar Olaizola (born 1979), Spanish pelota player
Aimar Sagastibelza (born 1984), Spanish football player
Aimar Sher (born 2002), Swedish football player
Aimar August Sørenssen (1823–1908), Norwegian politician
Aimar V of Limoges (1135–1199), French nobleman

People with Aimar as surname
Carlos Aimar (born 1950), Argentinian football player
Lucien Aimar (born 1941), French cyclist
Pablo Aimar (born 1979), Argentinian football player

References

Basque masculine given names